Shaadi Se Pehle (English: Before the Wedding or Before the Marriage) is a 2006 Indian Hindi comedy film directed by Satish Kaushik and produced by Subhash Ghai. The film stars Akshay Khanna, Suniel Shetty, Ayesha Takia, Mallika Sherawat, and Aftab Shivdasani in lead roles. It released on 6 April 2006.

The movie is loosely inspired by an old Hindi movie, Meri Biwi Ki Shaadi, starring Amol Palekar.

Plot
Ashish and Rani meet at a cold drink stall and over the next few days they fall in love. Rani introduces Ashish to her businessman dad, Tau, and mom, they unanimously frown upon this alliance, until Ashish promises to get a job, save enough money, buy a flat, etc. Ashish does get a small job with Izzat Papads, he then also begins to sell steroids out of the back of a van. He gets noticed by an Ad-firm owner, and gets hired. Soon he has all the luxuries that he had always dreamed of. When the Bhallas come to know about this, they decide to welcome him as their son-law, and a lavish engagement party takes place. It is then Ashish finds out that he has cancer, and he begins to create misunderstandings between him and Rani. He tries becoming an alcoholic, but that is considered normal with the Bhalla family; he confesses to Rani that he has loved Sania, a model with ad-agency, which is welcomed by Rani as being truthful and honest. But when Rani notices that he has put up Sania's photos all over his apartment, it is then that she breaks off the engagement. Ashish knows that Sania will not marry him, as she is a flirt. But when he is assigned to go to Malaysia with Sania, that is where he finds out that Sania is not quite a flirt, but wants to marry him. She even introduces him to her brother, Anna, who instantly approves of the match. Now Anna inducts Ashish into the family business - which is extortion, and a stunned Ashish is trained to use guns and defend himself. When the time comes for marriage, Ashish confesses that he has cancer. An angered Anna summons Dr. Rustom, who in turn gives him a clean health chit, and confirms that Ashish had overheard a conversation about another patient and had misunderstood. While Ashish becomes happy, Rani and their friend Rocky are planning to get married as Rohit always had feelings for Rani. Meanwhile, Sania also wants to get Ashish at any cost. In the climax in a car chase sequence, Ashish confronts Rani and confesses everything. It is then revealed that marriage with Rohit was a plan by Sania and Rohit as they knew how much Ashish loved Rani. Finally, they unite and the film ends on a happy note.

Cast
 Akshaye Khanna as Ashish Khanna
 Ayesha Takia as Rani Bhalla
 Suniel Shetty as Anna
 Aftab Shivdasani as Rohit Chopra
 Mallika Sherawat as Sania
 Boman Irani as Dr. Rustam
 Rajpal Yadav as Kanpuri
 Anupam Kher as Mangal Pratap Bhalla
 Gulshan Grover as Luca (Don)
 Mita Vasisht as Ashish's sister
 Vijayendra Ghatge as Mr. Sumit Bhalla
 Kishori Shahane as Mrs. Shreya Bhalla
 Dinesh Hingoo as Undertaker (Cemetery caretaker)
 Greg Roman as Roan path Pandey
 Vidyut Jammwal as a background dancer in "Ankhiyon Se Gal Kar Gayi" (uncredited)

Reception
The film grossed Rs. worldwide in its theatrical run. The film was commercial failure at the box office.

Soundtrack

                       
 "Bijuriya" - Alka Yagnik, Sukhwinder Singh
 "Tere Liye" - Alka Yagnik, Udit Narayan
 "Sache Aashiq" - Alka Yagnik, Sukhwinder Singh
 "Mundeya" - Sunidhi Chauhan
 "Ankhiyon Se Gal Kar Gayi" - Sukhwinder Singh, Sunidhi Chauhan, Sonu Nigam and Himesh Reshammiya
 "Tutiya Ve" - Daler Mehndi
 "Tere Liye" (remix) - Alka Yagnik, Udit Narayan
 "Bijuriya" (remix) - Alka Yagnik, Sukhwinder Singh
 "Tutiya Ve" (remix - DJ Suketu - Arranged by Aks) - Daler Mehndi
 "Mundeya" (remix) - Sunidhi Chauhan
 "Ankhiyon Se Gal Kar Gayi" (remix) - Sukhwinder Singh, Sunidhi Chauhan, Sonu Nigam and Himesh Reshammiya

References

External links
 

2006 films
2000s Hindi-language films
Films shot in Malaysia
Films scored by Himesh Reshammiya
Films about Indian weddings
Films directed by Satish Kaushik